Apalit, officially the Municipality of Apalit, is a 1st class municipality in the province of Pampanga, Philippines. According to the 2020 census, it has a population of 117,160 people.

The town is famous for its Apung Iru Fluvial Procession, which is listed as one of the most significant water-based intangible cultural heritage of the Philippines. The festival happens every June 28–30.

Geography

Apalit is surrounded by Macabebe, Masantol, Minalin and San Simon in Pampanga, and Calumpit, Pulilan, and Baliuag in Bulacan.

Barangays
Apalit is politically subdivided into 12 barangays:
 Balucuc (Nuestra Señora de la Divina Pastora)
 Calantipe (Santo Niño)
 Cansinala (Nuestra Señora del Rosario)
 Capalangan (Holy Cross)
 Colgante (Holy Family)
 Paligui (Chair of St. Peter / Apung Iru)
 Sampaloc (San Roque)
 San Juan (San Juan Nepomuceno) (Poblacion)
 San Vicente (San Vicente Ferrer) (Business District)
 Sucad (Santa Lucia)
 Sulipan (Christ the Eternal High Priest)
 Tabuyuc (Santo Rosario)

Climate

Demographics

Religion
Most inhabitants of Apalit are Christian, with a majority professing Catholicism, due to Spanish colonialism and imperialism from the 15th to 19th centuries. Other prominent Christian groups include Members Church of God International (MCGI, more popularly known for its program, Ang Dating Daan).

Catholicism

Apalit was first established as one of the visitas (mission chapel) under the administration of Convento de Calumpit.
In 1597, the Augustinian chapter accepted Apalit as House of Order under the advocacy of San Pedro Apostol where Fray Pedro de Vergara OSA as its first parish priest In conjunction with the annual town fiesta, the Libad was established by the Capitan del Pueblo, Don Pedro Armayan-Espíritu y Macam, on June 28, 1844.Libad fluvial procession also reaching Calumpit even today to signify the old relationship of Apalit to its mother town Calumpit where San Juan Bautista is the patron of the Town.

The first church and convento was constructed under the tenure of Fray Juan Cabello as parish priest from 1641 to 1645. Fray Simón de Alarcia built another church made of concrete and tile in 1854–1860, but it was destroyed by a strong earthquake in 1863. The present neo-classical church was built under Fray Antonio Redondo, who was assigned to Apalit from 1873 to 1886.

Father Gallende wrote in La Iglesia de Apalit:

It was officially inaugurated with solemn ceremonies held successively during the town fiesta from 28 to 30 June of the same year. The chronicler remarks that when there was no more sand or bricks, Fr. Redondo would ask the fiscal (sacristan) to go around town pealing the bells. Preceded by the town bands, he would lead the way towards the riverside with an azafate (a basket or hamper) on his head. Unquestioning, the whole town would follow him, and in less than two hours, the masons would have enough sand for two months. "The whole town of Apalit helped either with monetary donations, personal service, or with their good wishes." The church measures 59 meters long and 14 meters wide. The painting was done by a native of Apalit, an industrious pupil of Alberoni. The church possesses the qualities of good construction: "solidity, capacity, light and artistic beauty."

The towers were completed under the guidance of Rev Toríbio Fanjul in 1896. In 1989, a major church renovation was initiated by Monsignor Rústico G. Cuevas.

Feast of Saint Peter
The Libad, a fluvial procession in honour of the town's patron saint Peter the Apostle (known locally Apung Iru), is annually from 28 to 30 June. The event, where a centuries-old ivory image of the apostle is paraded along the Pampanga River, is one of the more famous religious processions in Pampanga.

History of the image
The life-sized, seated image of "Apung Iru" is an heirloom of the Armayan-Espíritu y Macam clan of Sitio Alauli, San Vicente, Apalit.  The image, with its ivory face and hands, dates from the last quarter of the 1700s. Family tradition has it that Don Pedro Armayan-Espíritu y Macam (d. 1904)–or his parents Don Calixto Armayan-Espíritu and Doña María Macam, acquired the image from an aunt, Doña Máxima Santos–in exchange for a considerable parcel of agricultural land in Apalit. During the Spanish colonial era, Spanish friars shrewdly assigned the ownership of the town's patron saint to wealthy families, so that the former could be spared the expenses of its upkeep and annual fiesta. The first Libad was held in 1844.

Custody of the image of Apung Iru has passed to the direct descendants of Don Pedro Armayan-Espíritu y Macam, who married three times: first to Doña Dorotea Arnedo; then Máxima Santa Rita; and finally Ysabel Dungo y Nocom. Don Pedro originally bequeathed the image to his favourite, his youngest daughter Doña Ysidora "Orang" Espíritu y Dungo (later Mrs Jesús Justo González), but she did not want the responsibility of being the image's camarera (custodian). She passed it on to her elder, spinster sister Doña Aurea "Ondeng" Espíritu y Dungo. After Doña Aurea's early death, Don Pedro's eldest daughter Doña María "Maruja" Espíritu y Dungo (later Mrs Macario Arnedo) became the image's camarera.  In 1928, Doña María translated the image of Apung Iru from the Armayan-Espíritu ancestral home in Sitio Alauli in Barangay San Vicente to her house in Barrio Capalangan, where it has remained since.

Doña María died in 1934, and her second daughter Doña Ysabel "Tabing" Arnedo y Espíritu (later Mrs Fernando Dueñas Reyes) became the image's "camarera" until her own death in 1970. Doña María's third daughter, Doña Rosario Lucia "Charing" Arnedo y Espíritu (later Mrs Augusto Diosdado Sioco González ) became camarera until her death in May 1977. The youngest daughter, Doña Elisa Juana "Ising" Arnedo y Espíritu (later Mrs Fortunato Kabiling Sazon) became the next camarera until her death in May 1987. Doña Elisa's eldest daughter, Dr. Erlinda Crispina "Linda" Arnedo Sazon (later Mrs Enrique Espíritu Badenhop) succeeded her mother as camarera from until her own death in February 2008. Augusto Marcelino "Toto" Reyes González III, Doña Rosario's grandson from her eldest son, Augusto Beda, is the current camarero of Apung Iru, following a stipulation that Doña Rosario and Doña Ysidora made to the family in 1970.

In 1975, Doña Ysidora, Doña Rosario, and the latter's son Brother Andrew Benjamin González, F.S.C., established Saint Peter's Mission, Inc. with the stipulation that Apung Iru and his feast be maintained by the generations to come.

Members Church of God International 

The 60-hectare Ang Dating Daan (ADD) compound in barangay Sampaloc is the headquarters of Members Church of God International in the Philippines. It houses the ADD Convention Center where major church gatherings are held and the chapel, a multipurpose venue for the community prayer, indoctrination sessions, prayer meetings and worship services. Other structures inside the compound include the baptistry, administration office, museum, transient home, orphanages, mini-hospital, dormitories for church officers and volunteers, houses for church ministers and workers and school buildings of La Verdad Christian College.

Government

Like other towns in the Philippines, Apalit is governed by a mayor and vice mayor who are elected to three-year terms. The mayor is the executive head and leads the town's departments in executing the ordinances and improving public services. The vice mayor heads a legislative council (Sangguniang Bayan) consisting of councilors from the Barangays or Barrios.

Elected officials

Municipal council (2019-2022): 
 Mayor: Oscar Tetangco Jr.
 Vice Mayor: Pedro C. Nucom 
 Councilors: 
Elias Mendoza III 
Kenneth Nunag
Kriz Mangsal 
Jed Dalusung 
Tuks Simon 
Andrew Manlapaz 
Mavic Mendoza
Pol Nabong

List of chief executives

Infrastructure

Transportation
Major roads and bridges:
 MacArthur Highway - The major road going to Apalit.
 Apalit-Macabebe-Masantol Road - going to the towns of Macabebe and Masantol
 Dr. Joaquin Gonzalez Avenue  -going to municipal hall, barangay sucad, and St. Peter's Parish
 Sulipan-Capalangan-Tabuyuc-Cansinala Road
 Tabuyuc-Balucuc Farm to Market Road
 Arnedo Dike Road
 Sampaloc Road
 Paligui Road

Public transportation
Public transportation within the municipality, like in most of the urban areas in the Philippines, is facilitated mostly using inexpensive Tricycles, jeepneys, and buses. Motored boats (or Bancas) are used to transport goods and bring people to the lowest land in case of flood in other barangays, Tricycles are used for short-distance travel. Various jeepney routes also ply the roads between Apalit and neighboring towns in Pampanga (municipalities of Macabebe, Masantol, San Simon, Minalin and City of San Fernando), in Bulacan (Calumpit, Malolos City and Balagtas). While the "FX" and "L300" van taxis, from their terminals, and Provincial Buses ( Victory Liner and First North Luzon Transit), which passes through the MacArthur Highway, takes passengers to key places in Bulacan (Calumpit, Malolos City to Guiguinto Tabang Toll Plaza) the "Metro" (Monumento in Caloocan; Cubao in Quezon City; Divisoria in Manila; and Pasay) and to northern provinces (Lubao, Floridablanca, Guagua, City of San Fernando in Pampanga; and as far as Olongapo City in Zambales).

Hospitals

 ADD Infirmary
 Apalit Doctors Hospital
 ASCCOM-DLSUMC Friendship Hospital
 E.D. Lim Maternity and General Hospital
La Verdad Diagnostic Center
Pampanga Premier Medical Center

Telecommunication
Landline telephone systems are being provided by the Digitel, Datelcom and PLDT. Mobile telephony services are provided by Smart Communications, Globe Telecom & Dito Telecommunity. Internet services are provided through DSL and Cable broadband coverage is provided by PLDT, Digitel and Globe Broadband; and Wireless broadband is provided by (Smart Bro) Smart Communications. Cable Television are provided by DATELSAT.

Education

For elementary and high school education, Apalit has numerous schools.

Private Schools
 Apalit Christian Ecumenical School
 Dominican School of Apalit
 La Verdad Christian College
 Gonzales Memorial College
 Holy Child Academy
 Saint Vincent's Academy
 Saint James School Inc.
 Maranatha Christian Academy of Apalit

Public schools
 San Vicente Central School
 Sampaga Elementary School
 Jose Escaler Memorial School
 Sucad Elementary School
 Sucad National High School
 Cansinala Elementary School
 Cansinala National High School
 Sampaga High School
 Colgante Elementary School
 Sampaloc Elementary School
 Paligui Elementary School
 Balucuc Elementary School
 Balucuc High School
 Calantipe High School (Formerly Balucuc High School Annex)
 Galang Elementary Memorial School
 Banag Elementary School
 Macario Arnedo Elementary School
 Tabuyuc Elementary School
 Apalit National High School
 Bro. Andrew Gonzalez Technical High School (Formerly Apalit Technical Vocational High School)
 Fausto Sioco Memorial School
 Sulipan Elementary School
• Apalit High School (Formerly Apalit National High School)

Colleges
 Asian Caregiving and Technology Education Centers (ACTEC)
 AMA Computer Learning Center College
 Eastwoods International Institute of Science and Technology
 Asian College of Science and Technology

Notable personalities

 Bro. Eli Soriano - served as the overall servant of the Members Church of God International notable for hosting his program Ang Dating Daan.
 Bishop Federico O. Escaler, S.J. - served as bishop ordinary of prelature of Kidapawan.

References

External links

Apalit Profile at PhilAtlas.com
[ Philippine Standard Geographic Code]
Philippine Census Information
Local Governance Performance Management System

Municipalities of Pampanga
Populated places on the Pampanga River